Barbara Murphy (15 October 1964 – 30 June 2021) was an Irish nephrologist known for her research in the immunology of kidney transplantation.

References 

Irish women scientists
1964 births
2021 deaths